The 2020 Swiss Women's Curling Championship, Switzerland's national women's curling championship, was held from February 9 to 15 in Thun, Switzerland. The winning Elena Stern team was supposed to represent Switzerland at the 2020 World Women's Curling Championship at the CN Centre in Prince George, British Columbia, Canada but the event got cancelled due to the COVID-19 pandemic.

The event featured the reigning World Champion rink Silvana Tirinzoni from Aarau, the Elena Stern rink from CC Oberwallis and two time World Champion team Binia Feltscher from Langenthal. In the final, Stern capped off an undefeated week by defeating Tirinzoni's team for the third time during the competition. Feltscher won the bronze medal with a 9–8 win over Nora Wüest.

Teams
The teams are listed as follows:

Round robin standings
Final round robin standings

Round robin results
All draw times are listed in Central European Time (UTC+01:00).

Draw 1
Sunday, February 9, 4:00 pm

Draw 2
Monday, February 10, 8:00 am

Draw 3
Monday, February 10, 4:00 pm

Draw 4
Tuesday, February 11, 9:00 am

Draw 5
Tuesday, February 11, 7:00 pm

Draw 6
Wednesday, February 12, 12:00 pm

Draw 7
Wednesday, February 12, 8:00 pm

Championship Round

Standings
Final Championship Pool standings

Results

Draw 8
Thursday, February 13, 6:00 pm

Draw 9
Friday, February 14, 12:00 pm

Draw 10
Friday, February 14, 6:00 pm

Finals

Bronze medal game
Saturday, February 15, 8:30 am

Final
Saturday, February 15, 5:30 pm

References

External links

Curling competitions in Switzerland
Thun
Swiss Women's Curling Championship
Sport in the Canton of Bern
Swiss Women's Curling Championship
Swiss Women's Curling Championship